The term Indian Mounds Park may refer to:

 Beattie Park Mound Group in Rockford, Illinois
 Effigy Mounds National Monument, Iowa
 Indian Mound Park in Dauphin Island, Alabama
 Indian Mound Park in Ortona, Florida
 Indian Mounds Park in Quincy, Illinois
 Indian Mounds Park in Saint Paul, Minnesota
 Indian Mounds Park in Whitewater, Wisconsin
 Indian Temple Mound and Museum in Fort Walton Beach, Florida
 Lake Jackson Mounds Archaeological State Park, Tallahassee, Florida
 Newark Earthworks in Newark, Ohio
 Ormond Mound in Ormond Beach, Florida
 Pompano Beach Mound in Pompano Beach, Florida
 Serpent Mound in Adams County, Ohio
 Sheboygan Indian Mound Park in Sheboygan, Wisconsin
 Velda Mound in Tallahassee, Florida